Darren Denaby Johnson (born 18 September 1966 from Mexborough) is an English professional darts player who currently competes in Professional Darts Corporation events. His most significant result came in 2017 where he was the runner-up in the 2017 PDPA Players Championship Barnsley, defeating Dave Chisnall, Raymond van Barneveld, Benito van de Pas and Michael van Gerwen before falling to Simon Whitlock in the final.

Career

Johnson lost his tourcard in 2018, Didn't regain his card at Q School and played on the Challenge Tour with limited success, Since Covid Johnson started playing on the WDF & Seniors tour, On the WDF Circuit he reached the Denmark Open final losing 6-1 to Sebastian Białecki & the English Nationals final losing to Scott Marsh 5-3. On 15th October 2022 he tasted his 1st WDF ranking success winning the Northern Ireland Open which he told commentators after it was his best moment of his career.He beat Nick Kenny 5-3 in the final. 

In the Seniors after a quiet year he picked up his first title in October 2022 winning the 5th Tour Open Series event beating Alan Tabern 6-5.

World Championship results

WDF
 2023:

WSDT
 2023: Second round (lost to Phil Taylor 1–3)

References

External links
http://www.dartsdatabase.co.uk/PlayerDetails.aspx?playerKey=1406

Living people
Professional Darts Corporation former tour card holders
English darts players
1966 births